Nicrophorus quadricollis may refer to:

Nicrophorus quadraticollis, misidentified in 1928 by Hatch
Nicrophorus olidus, misidentified in 1848 by Gistel